This is a list of Mississippi state parks. , the state park system of the U.S. state of Mississippi comprises 24 state parks and one natural area.

Current state parks

Defunct state parks or under other jurisdiction

Arkbutla State Park
Casey Jones State Park
Fort Maurepas State Park
Grand Gulf Military Monument Park, Port Gibson
Gulf Marine State Park
Nanih Waiya State Park, transferred to the Mississippi Band of Choctaw 2006
Sam Dale State Park
Winterville Mounds, 1960-2000, transferred to Department of Archives and History

See also
List of U.S. state parks
List of U.S. national parks

References

External links
State of Mississippi Department of Wildlife, Fisheries, and Parks

State parks of Mississippi
Mississippi state parks
State parks